Hexaoxotricyclobutabenzene is an organic compound with formula C12O6. It can be viewed as the sixfold ketone of tricyclobutabenzene.

It is an oxide of carbon, detected by 13C NMR in 2006.

References

Oxocarbons
Cyclobutenes
Enones